The Goychay Pomegranate Festival is an annual cultural festival that is held in Goychay, Azerbaijan. The festival features Azerbaijani fruit-cuisine mainly the pomegranates from Goychay. At the festival, a cultural parade is held with dances and music. 

In 2020, the Goychay Pomegranate Festival was inscribed in the Representative List of the Intangible Cultural Heritage of Humanity of UNESCO.

Concept 
The festival features a fair and an exhibition that displays different local varieties of pomegranates as well as various pomegranate products produced by local enterprises. During the festival, music and dance performances are presented each year. The festival also includes athletic performances and various craftsmen, potters, millers, blacksmiths, artists, performances of folklore groups and paintings.

Gallery

References

External links

See also
 Quba Apple Festival

Festivals in Azerbaijan
Goychay District
Autumn events in Azerbaijan